"Sweet, Sweet Love" is a song written and recorded by Australian singer Russell Morris and produced by Howard Gable. It was released as the lead single from his debut album Bloodstone. It peaked at number 7 on the Australian Go-Set chart in July 1971; this becoming Morris' fourth top ten single.

In a performance of the song in 2007, Morris said he originally wrote the song for John Farnham who turned the song down saying 'it takes too long to get to the chorus'.

"Sweet Sweet Love" is made up of two songs, inspired by a photo of his then-wife which he stuck up on the wall in bedsit in London while trying for UK success.

Music and review
The song is set in the key of Dm 

Australian music journalist Ian McFarlane said; ""Sweet, Sweet Love" is just a great pop ballad with a terrific arrangement. It starts out in a gentle, minor key way and then about halfway through the pay off comes when Morris changes key, ups the tempo and the whole thing just takes off – as good a pop song as any in 1971."

Track listing
 7" Single
Side A "Sweet, Sweet Love" - 4:19
Side B "Jail Jonah's Daughter" - 2:56

Charts
"Sweet, Sweet Love" was released in June 1971, before peaking at number 9 for the week commencing 14 August 1971.

Weekly charts

Year-end charts

References

1971 singles
1971 songs
Russell Morris songs
EMI Records singles
Songs written by Russell Morris